Thalia is a feminine given name of ancient Greek origin. It may refer to the following notable people:

 Thalía (Ariadna Thalía Sodi Miranda Mottola; born 1971), Mexican singer and actress
 Thalia Assuras (born 1951), anchor of energyNOW!, a TV news-magazine and opinion program produced by the American Clean Skies Foundation
 Thalia C. Eley, Professor of Developmental Behavioural Genetics at the Institute of Psychiatry's MRC Social, Genetic and Developmental Psychiatry Centre, King's College London, UK
 Thalia Charalambous (born 1989), Cypriot long-distance runner
 Thalia Gouma-Peterson (1933-2001), Greek-born art historian
 Thalia Field (born 1966), American writer and editor known for innovative fiction and interdisciplinary collaborations
 Thalia Flora-Karavia (1871–1960), Greek artist and member of the Munich School who was best known for her sketches of soldiers at war
 Thalia Iakovidou (born 1972), Greek athlete
 Thalia Mara (1911–2003), American ballet educator and author of books on the subject
 Thalia Massie (1911–1963), member of a socially prominent family who became the genesis of a series of heavily publicized trials in Hawaii
 Thalia Munro (born 1982), American water polo player for the UCLA Bruins and the US National Team, who won the bronze medal at the 2004 Athens Olympics
 Thalia Myers (born 1945), British concert pianist, teacher and animateur
 Thalía Olvino (born 1999), Venezuelan actress, model and beauty pageant titleholder
 Thalia Pellegrini (born 1978), British television presenter
 Thalia Sabanieva (1889–1963), Greek soprano singer
 Thalia Tran, American actress
 Thalia Zedek (born 1961), American singer and guitarist

See also
 Thalia (disambiguation)
 Talia (given name)